Jiang Feng ( born 27 February 1970) is a Chinese former football midfielder who played for China in the 1996 Asian Cup. He also played for Jilin, Liaoning FC, Qianwei Huandao, Qingdao Etsong Hainiu, Sinchi FC and Jiangsu Sainty.

Biography
Jiang Feng started his career playing for his local football team Jilin during the semi-professional period within Chinese football, however before the advent of full-professionalism at the start of the 1994 Chinese Jia-A League season he became one of the first transfers in the new era when he joined the reigning league title holders Liaoning FC before the start of the season. His time with Liaoning did not start well and he was caught stamping on Shanghai Shenhua player Wu Chengying, which saw him banned from the Chinese Football Association for the rest of the season. When he returned he was then part of the team that would unfortunately guide the club into the relegation zone at the end of the 1995 Chinese Jia-A League season. Despite the relegation Jiang still managed to be included into the squad that took part 1996 Asian Cup and when he returned he joined recently promoted club Qianwei Huandao to revive his career. After establishing the club as a top tier team and moving to Chongqing as they eventually renamed themselves Chongqing Lifan F.C. Jiang left the club after five seasons to join Qingdao Etsong Hainiu where he went on to win the 2002 Chinese FA Cup. Nearing the end of his career Jiang would join Sinchi FC and play in Singapore's S.League before ending his career with second tier football club Jiangsu Sainty.

Honours
Jilin
Yi League: 1990

Qingdao Etsong Hainiu
Chinese FA Cup: 2002

References

External links

Team China Stats

1970 births
Living people
Chinese footballers
Footballers from Jilin
China international footballers
Yanbian Funde F.C. players
Liaoning F.C. players
Chongqing Liangjiang Athletic F.C. players
Qingdao Hainiu F.C. (1990) players
Jiangsu F.C. players
Chinese Super League players
China League One players
Asian Games silver medalists for China
Asian Games medalists in football
Association football midfielders
Footballers at the 1994 Asian Games
Medalists at the 1994 Asian Games
Guangzhou City F.C. non-playing staff